Bar   (Montenegrin and Serbian: Бар, ; ;  or Antibari) is a coastal town and seaport in southern Montenegro. It is the capital of the Bar Municipality and a center for tourism. According to the 2011 census, the city proper had 13,503 inhabitants, while the total population of Bar Municipality was 42,068.

Name
Bar is a shortened form of Antivari. The name is thought to be derived from the Latin Antibarum or Antibari, which later in Greek was transformed into Antivárion / Antivari due to its pronunciation. A name taken because of its location and which means "in front of Bari". Variations are in Italian, Antivari / Antibari; in Albanian, Tivari or Tivar; in Turkish, Bar;  in Greek, Θηβάριον, Thivárion, Αντιβάριον, Antivárion; in Latin, Antibarium

History

Ancient times
Local archaeological findings date to the Neolithic era. It is assumed that Bar was mentioned as the reconstructed Roman castle, Antipargal, in the 6th century. The name Antibarium was quoted for the first time in the 10th century.

Middle Ages
In the 6th and 7th centuries, Slavs occupied the Balkans. Duklja, a Slavic, or Serbian state, was mentioned in the 10th century. Jovan Vladimir (ruler 1000–1016), of Skadarska Krajina is the first ruler of Duklja whose history is known. Stefan Vojislav (ruler 1018–1043), the eponymous founder of the Vojislavljević dynasty, defeated the Byzantines in a battle on a hill near Bar. He made Bar his seat of power. Vojislav then expanded the area under his rule. Mihailo I of Duklja (ruler 1050–1081), Vojislav's son, established the Archdiocese of Antivari. He continued to fight the Byzantines in order to secure the town's independence. This led to a union of states known as the Serbian Grand Principality. From 1101 to 1166, the principality was ruled by the Vukanović dynasty. However, for much of this time, Bar was under Byzantine rule. In 1183, Stefan Nemanja conquered and destroyed Bar which remained under Serbian control until the death of Dušan (1355).

Venetian and Ottoman period

From 1443 to 1571, the region was ruled by  Venice who called it Antivari, and it was part of the Albania Veneta. It was a town with its own coat of arms, flag, statute and mint. In 1571, the Ottomans captured Antivari and held the town until 1878. The archdiocese was preserved. With the Ottoman conquest, the Catholic Church in the border area and the Archdiocese of Bar began to collapse, because indigenous people began to migrate as Ottomans to that area brought a new ethnic and religious element. Because of a lack of Catholic priests, entire parishes were converted to Orthodoxy.   One of the archbishops during this period was Andrija Zmajević. 

In 1571, The Ottomans expelled the Orthodox and Catholic population. 

The Ottomans ceded Antivari to Montenegro at the Treaty of Berlin, after losing the Russo-Turkish War. Montenegro's initial main goal in the negotiations was its expansion in Herzegovina and the Sanjak of Novi Pazar, but Austro-Hungarian expansion made it unrealistic. The Ottomans, represented by Alexander Karatheodori Pasha, declared that they would cede the port of Spizza to Montenegro but not Bar and other areas because they claimed they were primarily inhabited by Catholics and Muslim Albanians. After negotiations between Foreign Ministers Gyula Andrássy (Austria-Hungary) and Pyotr Andreyevich Shuvalov (Russia), it was agreed that Bar would be ceded to Montenegro in return for Russian support for Austrian control over Herzegovina. The city-port of Bar itself became militarily neutral, the total number of Montenegrin vessels in the port was placed under limitations and Austria-Hungary acquired the right of patrol of Bar's coastline.

Montenegro renamed the town Bar, although virtually everyone else, including their neighbours, Italy and Austria-Hungary, continued to name it Antivari. In the new Montenegrin Orthodox state, Bar went through urban depopulation because many of its urban inhabitants which were in fact Muslims either left or were expelled from the town. In the late 1850s, the town had 4,000 inhabitants, 62.5% of which were Muslims.  More than half of its population left or was expelled after 1878. The first population register of the town under Montenegrin administration in 1879, counted 1,879 inhabitants. Muslims were 30.9% of the population, 24.6% were Catholics (mostly Albanians) in addition to a mostly Serbian Orthodox population.

Contemporary
Guglielmo Marconi, the Italian scientist and pioneer in wireless telegraphy, using Nikola Tesla's patented technology, made a radio connection between Antivari (Bar) and Bari on 30 August 1904. In 1908, the first railroad in this part of the Balkans was put into operation there.

On 8 August 1914 Austria-Hungary responded to Montenegro's declaration of war by sending their protected cruisers SMS Zenta and SMS Szigetvár accompanied by the destroyer SMS Uskoke and torpedo boat 72F to conduct an unopposed bombardment of the port of Antivari, targeting its wireless station and harbour facilities. They were driven away by coastal batteries and destroyed only a wireless station. The Austrians declared a formal blockade of the Montenegrin coastline on August 10. On August 16, SMS Zenta and an accompanying destroyer were ambushed and trapped off Antivari by a very large French fleet (over twelve battleships), and in the subsequent Battle of Antivari the Zenta was sunk with considerable loss of life. The destroyer escaped. On the 18 September following, the Austro-Hungarian coastal battleship SMS Budapest with supporting warships bombarded Antivari, the port and facilities, causing major damage, and on October 17–18 the destroyers SMS Scharfschutze, SMS Streiter and SMS Ulan bombarded Antivari's harbour. On November 18 the destroyer SMS Uskoke also conducted a brief bombardment. The Austrians made their largest raid to date on the evening and night of 1–2 March 1915 when their destroyers SMS Csikós, SMS Streiter, and SMS Ulan covered a raid by three torpedo-boats into Antivari harbour. The latter destroyed the main wharf and stocks of food and ammunitions along the waterfront, and captured the Montenegrin royal yacht Rumija, which was later torpedoed. The destruction of the wharves prevented larger ships from unloading supplies at the port restricting Allied shipments of food and munitions to the Montenegrin army. The Allies realised that with the Austro-Hungarian naval base of Cattaro close by there was little they could do. In 1979, there was an earthquake that devastated Bar. It has since been rebuilt.

When Montenegro signed an agreement with the Chinese Government to build a motorway from Bar to the Serbian border (part of the Belt and Road initiative) in 2014, large tracts of land around Bar were agreed as collateral in the event of the Montenegro government defaulting on payment of the 1 billion dollar loan. The project was financed by the Export-Import Bank of China. Contractual disputes can only be resolved through a Chinese court.

Geography

Location
Bar is located on the coastal western border of Montenegro on the shore of the Adriatic Sea. To the west, across the sea, is Italy.

Climate
Bar has a borderline humid subtropical (Cfa) and Mediterranean climate (Csa) in the Köppen climate classification, since the driest month has  of precipitation, preventing it from being classified as solely humid subtropical or Mediterranean. Snow is very rare occurrence in Bar, it usually snows once in a few years. The highest recorded snowfall occurred during January 2000, when  was measured. Summers are generally warmer, drier and sunnier than the winter months. Precipitation is low during the summer months, although rainfall can still occur, with July averaging 4.5 days with measurable precipitation. Spring and fall are transitional seasons that feature mild weather that can often be wet and unpredictable. There are, on average, 2523 hours of sunshine per year, ranging from a low of 111.6 hours in December to a high of 350.3 hours in July.

Flora and fauna

The coastal part of Bar supports maquis shrubland with oak, holm oak, laurel, myrtle, Spanish broom, oleander, hawthorn, sloe, thorn, butcher's broom and asparagus. To the north and the mountains, there are oak and beech forests.
Citrus fruits including tangerine, orange and lemon grow in the Bar area as do pomegranates, olives, grapevines and figs. Ginkgo biloba grows in the park of King Nikola's palace.

Skadar Lake is rich in bird life including the pelican. Game animals are found in Ostros, Rumija, Lisinj, Sutorman and Sozina and include rabbit, badger, fox, wolf and boar. At the Bar sea shore one finds various kinds of shells, snails, echinodermata, cephalopoda and crayfish.

Demographics

Bar is the administrative centre of Bar Municipality, which includes the town of Sutomore and other small coastal towns. A census in 2011 recorded 42,048 people in the Bar Municipality. Bar city had 13,503 inhabitants.

Divisions and settlements
The municipality of Bar is divided into 12 communes (mjesna zajednica), consisting of 83 settlements:

Ethnicity
Ethnic composition of the town in 2011:

Religion

The main religion in Bar is Orthodox Christianity. However, there are churches from both the Eastern Orthodox and Catholic traditions as well as mosques built by Ottomans in the Islamic tradition. Bar is the birthplace of Saint Jovan Vladimir. In 1089, the Roman Catholic Archdiocese of Bar, was founded and included most of Montenegro and Serbia.

Places of worship
 St. George cathedral was built in the 12th century. Saint George was the medieval patron saint of Bar.
 The remains of the Bar Triconch church lie in the center of Bar. It is the oldest Christian religious building in Montenegro, dating to the 6th century AD. It was built during Justinian's reign. The height of the preserved church walls is one metre. While carrying out research on the church, fragments of decorative stone moulds and a necropolis were found. It is where the Chronicle of the Priest of Duklja (Ljetopis popa Dukljanina) was written in the second half of the 12th century. It is the region's most important medieval work of literature.
 Our Lady of Ratac (Bogorodica Ratačka) Benedictine monastery is located on the Ratac peninsula, between Bar and Sutomore. It was established in the 9th century AD.
 St. Tekla church was constructed in the 13th century from broken stone. At has been an Orthodox church, a Uniate church and then had another Catholic altar installed both of which remain. It is visited by people of both faiths and people of both faiths are buried in its cemetery.
 St. Roko church ruins are located near Sutomore. The church dates from the 14th century. Although the church had only one altar, it served both the Orthodox and Catholic faithful.
 St Atanasije church dates to the late 14th century. Around the church, there are several tombs covered with stone slabs.
 St. Petka church was built in the Middle Ages and is constructed of roughly hewn stone.
 St. Nikola church represents the Archbishopric of the City of Bar. In 1089, the archbishopric was founded and was confirmed by Pope Clement III when he sent the palij (mantle) to the Archbishop of Duklja. The archbishop was given the title Primas Serbiae.
 Ribnjak Monastery is located in the village of Zupci. Ruins of a church possibly founded by Jelena Anžujska (d‘Anjou) Nemanjić were found at the monastery. The monastery consists of a church dedicated to St. Vasilije Ostroški, a baptistry and accommodation building. The upper church, located above Ribnjak monastery, on Gradac hill is dedicated to the Holy Cross. It was constructed by two sirdars and a senator of the Principality of Montenegro between 1877 and 1878 after battles for liberation. King Nikola may have used the church as a base to plan his liberation operations. There is a long tradition of going to Ribnjak on 12 May each year, St. Vasilije Ostroški's Day.
 Monastery of the Mother of God of Ratac is a Benedictine monastery dating to the 11th century AD. Its ruins are located on Cape of Ratac, between Bar and Sutomore. The ruins show three churches and several buildings protected by defence walls and towers. From 1443, the monastery was under Venetian authority. In 1571, it was burnt down by the Ottomans.
 Gornji Brčeli Monastery: The monastery is located in the village of Brčeli, which is named after the monastery. It was founded at the beginning of the 18th century by Bishop Danilo, as his winter residence. Within the monastery, there is the church dedicated to the Shroud of the Mother of God with an iconostasis, the handiwork of Petar Čolanović that dates from 1928. The monastery building and church are encompassed by a high stone wall with the main gate on the southern side. A one-sided belfry with a spinning-wheel mechanism was built on the wall beside the gate, on its eastern side. The old accommodation building was constructed as a typical house in Crmnica, with distinctive arched doorways and terraces. In 1863, a school was established within the monastery, which was later moved to the adjacent monastery of Donji Brčeli.

 Donji Brčeli Monastery is a 15th-century monastery located in Donji Brčeli. There is an associated church dedicated to St. Nikola where there is an arched room under the floor of the chapel. Its entrance is via the floor under the altar area. It is believed that this room was used as a dungeon during the reign of Šćepan Mali. Later, Šćepan Mali was murdered and buried in this church. The monastery also had a school.
 Omerbašića Mosque is located in Bar old town. It was constructed in 1662. Its structure is rather simple, with a rectangular base, and a minaret built next to the south-west wall. At the beginning of the 17th century, Dervish Hasan's domed burial site was built beside the mosque, at the entrance to the complex. A smaller ground level building was built next to it and was used as a residence. A public fountain was constructed near the entrance and later, a mosque house for a Muslim priest or imam was built as well. The whole complex is surrounded by a stone wall.
 Church of the Holy Mother, Gluhi Do village.
 St. Jovan, a two-nave church on the Virpazar-Bar road at Boljevići village.
 St. Mihailo, a two-nave church at the community cemetery in the village of Sotonići.
 Orahovo Monastery in Orahovo) village.
 St. Marija church near Bar old town.
 Podgradska Mosque was built by several prominent citizens, among them Dervish Hasan Said. In 1881, in the explosion of Barutana, the mosque was demolished. A new mosque was built in the 1900s. The minaret was built in 1971, and refurbished in 1991.

Churches and monasteries dating to the era of the Balšić family (14th and 15th centuries) are located on the islands of Lake Skadar including Beška, Moračnik and Starčevo. This area is called the Holy Land of Montenegro.
 Starčevo Monastery is located on the island of Starčevo on Skadar Lake. It dates from the period of Đurđe Balšić. It was founded in 1377 by Father Makarije, who lived as an ascetic on the island. (Starčev means old man.) The monastery complex consists of the Church of the Assumption of the Mother of God, an accommodation building, supporting structures and a surrounding wall with a gate and several underpinned terraces. The monastery was a centre of literacy, where many manuscripts were rewritten and many books were bound and decorated. The crypt of Božidar Vuković of Podgorica, a printer, is located in this monastery. After the reconstruction of a part of the accommodation building, Starčevo became once again an inhabited and active monastery.
 Moračnik Monastery: It is located on the island of Moračnik on Skadar Lake. It was first mentioned in 1417, in the Charter of Balša III. The monastery complex consists of a church dedicated to the Holy Mother of God, an accommodation building, dining room and high tower with four floors, surrounded by a stone wall with a monumental gate.
 Beška Monastery: It is located in the middle of the island of Beška on Skadar Lake. The monastery consists of two churches: a larger one, dedicated to St. Đorđe (14th century), the endowment of Đurđe II Stracimirović-Balšić and a smaller one dedicated to the Holy Mother of God (1440), the endowment of Jelena Balšić. Beška Monastery, as well as Starčevo Monastery, was famous for its intensive transcription activities. The Gorička Anthology was written in this monastery. It is a religious, edifying transcript composed by Nikon Jerusalimac.
 Monastery of The Virgin of Krajina is a significant monument in Montenegro. Ruins of the monastery and church are dedicated to the Assumption of the Mother of God. The monument is located near Ostros, on the shores Lake Skadar. The church was first mentioned at the end of the 10th century in The Chronicle of Priest Dukljan. The monastery was founded by Duke Vladimir, well known from a legend involving his tragic love for Kosara, daughter of the Macedonian Tsar Samuilo. At one time, the monastery was the residence of the archbishop of Zeta. At the end of the 16th century, the monastery was completely destroyed. In its vicinity, in Ostros, there is a well from the year 1001, which is still used for supplying water to the inhabitants of local villages.
 St. Archangel church at Donja Seoca on the shore of Lake Skadar.

Economy
The economy of Bar relies upon the Port of Bar, the Belgrade–Bar railway and the Sozina tunnel. The Port of Bar is the most recognizable feature of the city. It occupies  of seacoast, land area of 800 ha and aquatorium of 200ha. It is capable of reloading 5 million tons of goods annually. In 1976, the Belgrade – Bar railway was opened. It made the Adriatic coast accessible to tourists, and transport to the Port of Bar. The food company, Primorka has been operating in Bar for more than 50 years. It produces olive oil and pomegranate juice. There are 95,000 olive trees, about 80,000 citrus trees (lemon, orange, tangerine and grapefruit) in the municipal area. The centre for subtropical cultures, founded in 1937, is the oldest scientific institution in Montenegro. Tourism is also a major part of Bar's economy.

Transport
Bar has a ferry line to Bari, Italy which is operated by Montenegro Lines. In season, ferries also go to Ancona, Italy. Bar is well connected with inland Montenegro, as well as with the rest of the Montenegrin coast. Bar is connected to other coastal towns by the Adriatic motorway, which extends from Ulcinj to Herceg Novi, and on to Croatia. Bar is also the final station of the Belgrade–Bar railway, which connects Bar with Podgorica, northern Montenegro and Serbia. There are regular flights to Belgrade, Budapest, Zürich, Frankfurt, Ljubljana, London, Paris, Rome and Vienna. As well the Blueline bus company provides public bus service with the central city of Bar as well as  near the city of Sutomoro. There is also inter city bueses as well as international buses such as Flexbus

Tourism
Although there are some stony beaches in Bar itself, many tourists choose destinations in other small towns in the Bar municipality, including Sutomore, with its long sandy beach. The natural area around Bar is mostly untouched and is rich in vegetation. The Bar municipality stretches to the southern shore of Skadar lake and encompasses Krajina region. This area is visited for its leisure activities and hiking. Smaller settlements near Bar, such as Dobra Voda, Sutomore and Čanj, are a destination for sunbathing, as they incorporate long sandy beaches.

Places of interest

 The Old Olive of Mirovica is said to be one of the oldest olive trees in Europe and one of the oldest trees in the world.  In 1957, it was placed under state protection. Numerous legends and traditions are associated with the tree. For instance, families that had a dispute would come to the tree to make peace. This explains its name, Mirovica, mir meaning peace.
 King Nikola's palace was built in 1885. It was a present from King Nikola to his daughter Princess Zorka and his son-in-law, Prince Petar Karađorđević. The construction included a large palace, a little palace, a chapel, guardhouses and a winter garden. In 1910, a spacious ballroom was added. A botanic garden has Mediterranean vegetation including a cork tree. There is also a large flower garden in a stainless steel structure of interesting shape. it was a gift from King Emmanuel of Italy to King Nikola. It is now a restaurant called Knjaževa bašta (The Duke’s Garden). At the front of the palace, there was a wooden pier. Between 1866 and 1916, King Nikola owned ten yachts. One of them, Sibil, was bought from Jules Verne, the novelist. The last yacht bought was the Rumija. In 1915, it was sunk in the Bar harbour by the Austro-Hungarian navy. The palace complex houses the Bar city museum. It is also used as a venue for festivals, concerts, exhibitions and literary events.
 Mount Rumija Fortress Nehaj Fortress, partially preserved, is located near the small seaside town of Sutomore. It has been held by both Venetians and Ottoman Turks. It was first recorded as the 16th century Fortezza dei Spizi, a Venetian fortified town.
 Bar old town. The Bar Aqueduct was constructed during the 16th and 17th centuries.

Beaches
In the north is Čanj, which has a  sandy beach. A boat takes tourists from Čanj to the Kraljičina Plaža. It lies below a natural wall of sedimentary rock. Further south is  Maljevik Beach. Near the medieval monastery complex of Ratac is Crvena Plaža, named after the colour of its fine sand. The beach is surrounded by a pine forest and located about a hundred m from the main road to Bar. Just north of the Bar central business district is the  Žukotrlica Beach. It is a gravel beach, surrounded by a pine forest and varied Mediterranean vegetation. The Bar Gradska Plaža is located in front of King Nikola's palace. It is surrounded by tourist facilities, restaurants and discothèques. On the border of the Bar and Ulcinj municipalities, in the village of Bušat, is the Val Maslina with its nearby olive groves. There are also beaches on the shore of Lake Skadar including the sandy Murići village beach and Pješačac.

Culture

Sport

Bar has over fifty sports clubs, and associations including a chess club. The town's major football club is FK Mornar who share the Stadion Topolica with lower league sides FK Hajduk Bar and Stari Bar team FK Sloga Bar. Bar once had two teams in the top tier, with OFK Bar featuring in the 2010–11 season alongside FK Mornar. KK Mornar Bar is the local basketball club.

There are numerous sports facilities in the Bar hotels and schools. In the centre of town, most of the facilities are in the Sports and Recreation Centre. Water sports such as diving are common. Sports tourism is promoted because of the proximity to the sea and lake. Bar hosted the 2010 FIBA Europe Under-16 Championship and the 2010 Men's u18 European Handball Championship.

Festivals and events
 Summer with the stars is an annual musical festival held in July and August at King Nikola's Walk. The tourist organisation of Bar sponsors music concerts with singers from Montenegro and former Yugoslav republics.
 The Мotorcycle race of Sutomore is an annual race in early May and September.
 The International athletic meeting is held each May Day on Madžarica stadium beside seashore.
 The Crmnica Games are held on weekends from mid-July to mid-August in Virpazar.
 An Agricultural show is held each year in early September in Virpazar to promote local produce.
 The Zagrađe tourism show is held annually in July and August in Zagrade.
 The Lake Skadar Ecology, Tourism and Culture Day is held annually in July, in Murići.
 The Mrkojevići family day is held in the last week of July, in Pečurice as a celebration of culture and traditions of the area.
 The Bar Guitar Fest is an annual gathering of guitar teachers and musicians held in January.
 The Olive Festival is held in Bar old town.
 The  Wine and Bleak festival is held in December, in Virpazar.
 The Old Olive Tree Gathering has been held every November since 1987. It celebrates children's works and works for children. Children are represented in literary and art works with the theme Olives, Peace and Friendship.
 The Port Cup is an international annual volleyball tournament for women which commenced in 1992.
 The Bar Marathon is a swimming race held in Bar in August. Contestants swim  between the Hotel Sozina, Sutomore and the Hotel Topolica, in Bar. The event commenced in 1988.
 The Chronicle of Bar''' is an annual summer multimedia festival with theatre plays, art exhibitions, literary events, and concerts and the Mediterranean Book Fair. It commenced in 1988.
 The International Television Festival'' has been held each November since 1995 to celebrate the television arts.

Notable people

International relations

Twin towns — sister cities
Bar is twinned with:

 Adana, Turkey
 Bari, Italy
 Bor, Serbia
 Bornova, Turkey
 Cherepovets, Russia
 Corfu, Greece
 Elbasan, Albania
 Hongkou (Shanghai), China
 Küçükkuyu, Turkey
 Kula, Serbia
 Kursk, Russia
 Kragujevac, Serbia
 Mali Iđoš, Serbia
 Maribor, Slovenia
 Mariupol, Ukraine
 Ningbo, China
 Nuremberg, Germany
 Piaseczno, Poland
 Podolsk, Russia
 Požarevac, Serbia
 Resen, North Macedonia
 Vodnjan, Croatia
 Živinice, Bosnia and Herzegovina

References

Sources

External links

 Official site of Bar municipality (in Montenegrin)
 News site for Bar
 Tourist Organization of Bar
 Old Bar Fortress-City
 Bar Attractions

 
Port cities and towns of the Adriatic Sea
Mediterranean port cities and towns in Montenegro
Populated places in Bar Municipality
Former capitals of Montenegro